The Lexus IS (XE20) is the second generation of the Lexus IS line of compact executive cars. Sold by Lexus since 2005, the line includes multiple V6 gasoline-powered models, in four-door sedan and two-door coupé convertible body styles. Additional sedan models also feature inline-four diesel powertrains, and an F marque version, the IS F, features a V8 engine. A pre-production car of the second generation IS model was first shown at the 2005 Geneva Auto Show, with the production version debuting at the 2005 New York Auto Show. The second generation was only available as a sedan until the two-door coupé convertible variants debuted in 2008.

The IS is built on a shortened version of the rear-wheel drive midsize platform introduced for the third generation Lexus GS, and also used on the Japanese-market Toyota Crown and Toyota Mark X. The chief engineer of the second generation IS was Suguya Fukusato, a rally driver. The second generation IS sedans were sold until 2013, when the third generation (XE30) debuted; however the coupé convertible model continued to be sold through 2014.



History of development

Development
After commencement of U.S. sales of the XE10 in 2000, development begun on its successor, the XE20 under chief engineer Suguya Fukusato in 2001. Design work was done under Kengo Matsumoto for a period of 2 years from 2002 into late 2003 when the final conceptual design by Hiroyuki Tada, utilizing the new corporate styling theme of L-finesse was chosen. From 2003 into the first half of 2004, the conceptual design was further refined into the production design specifications, being then approved by the executive board. Design patents were filed in September 2004 in Japan, on 18 February 2005 in Europe, and 25 February 2005 at the United States Patent Office upon conclusion of development in early 2005.

Exterior and interior

The second generation Lexus IS was the second debut of Lexus' new L-finesse design philosophy on a production vehicle, following the premiere of the 2006 Lexus GS performance sedan. The new IS design featured sleeker, coupé-like contours, a fastback profile, and a repeated arrowhead motif in the front fascia and side windows based on the Japanese concept of kirikaeshi, referring to angular movements. The forward design was reminiscent of the earlier Lexus LF-C coupé concept. Compared to its predecessor, the second generation IS was  longer and nearly  wider, largely due to a  wheelbase stretch. The grille was set at a lower level than the headlights. The new IS body resulted in a 0.28 Cd figure.

The second generation IS interior features leather seats, lightsaber-like electroluminescent instrument display lighting and LED interior lighting accents, 10-way (including lumbar) driver and front passenger power seats, and the choice of faux-metallic or optional Bird's Eye Maple wood grain trim made by Yamaha piano craftsmen from sustainable plantations. The interior design also derived elements from Japanese concepts, including hazushi, where an object retains individuality while being part of a large whole, as typified in side air vents. Other available interior features include perforated leather seats, heated and ventilated front seats, power tilt/telescoping steering wheel, moonroof, electrochromic side view mirrors, power rear sunshade, and aluminum scuff plates.

Safety systems

The Lexus IS features standard dual front airbags, front row knee airbags, front and rear side curtain airbags, and front side torso airbags. The new IS also debuted its manufacturer's latest twin-chamber, V-shaped front passenger airbag. Initially, the IS 250 came with the Vehicle Stability Control (VSC) system while the IS 350 used a more advanced VDIM system which reacts sooner with less intrusive operation. A Pre-Collision System (PCS) is the first offered in the entry-luxury performance sedan market segment.

National Highway Traffic Safety Administration (NHTSA) crash test results in 2008 rated the IS the maximum five stars in the Side Driver and Rollover categories, and four stars in the Frontal Driver, Frontal Passenger, and Side Rear Passenger categories. Euro NCAP scores were the maximum five stars in Adult Occupant, four stars in Child Occupant, and two of four stars in Pedestrian test categories. The Insurance Institute for Highway Safety gives the Lexus IS sedan a "Good" overall score for both front and side impact tests, and also ranks the IS "Good" in all other measured categories in the front and side impact crash tests but give it a "Poor" score for small overlap front.

Technical features
For the IS 250, IS 350, and IS F, engines feature the manufacturer's D-4S direct injection system; these models are ULEV-II emission certified in the United States by the California Air Resources Board. The IS line also features an Electric Power Steering (EPS) system which replaces the previous hydraulic steering pump.

Technical features on the second generation Lexus IS further include rain-sensing wipers, Intuitive Park Assist (IPA), bi-xenon headlamps, Adaptive Front-lighting System (AFS), and Dynamic Radar Cruise Control. Lexus' SmartAccess keyless entry with push-button start is a standard feature along with a memory system that can recall driver's seat, side mirror, and steering positions. A high-resolution 7" touchscreen DVD-based Gen V navigation system with voice recognition, Bluetooth, a backup camera, and a 14-speaker Mark Levinson premium sound system are available as options.

Updates
In response to criticism regarding the lack of a stability/traction control disable switch on 2006 IS models, Lexus added a VDIM/VSC off switch for the 2007 model year. For 2006 IS models, the stability control system/traction control system can be disabled through non-conventional methods by using a code during engine start.

In the 2007 IS models, in addition to the on/off switch for the traction-control system, Lexus added a roof-mounted shark-fin antenna in some markets. (The Australian delivered IS models did not receive the fin-style antenna until its first appearance on the IS F in 2008). For 2008 models, the steering system was tweaked for improved steering feel and the rear seats were modified to improve rear room.

The 2008 mid-cycle refresh for the 2009 model year (designed by Takahiro Kanno in 2007) included revised interior and exterior styling, the suspension and steering was retuned for improved stability and control, and the IS 250 also gained VDIM as standard for the 2009 model year. In 2009, Masanari Sakae designed revisions to the IS Line, which were patent registered in November 2009 in Japan and 27 April 2010 in Europe. In the second quarter of 2010 (2011 MY), these new revisions were introduced, featuring a refreshed exterior with new wheels, LED daytime running lights, additional interior features, and dedicated IS F-Sport production models.

Standard models

GSE20 / GSE21 (2005)
The IS 250 (GSE20) went on sale in 2005 in Japan and North America in RWD (GSE20) and IS 250 AWD (GSE25) configuration, along with the more powerful rear-wheel drive IS 350 (GSE21) sedan. The IS 250 RWD comes standard with a 6-speed manual transmission, and a 6-speed automatic transmission is available as an option. All other gasoline-powered IS sedans are only available with the automatic.

The IS 350 shares larger braking discs and calipers borrowed from the GS 430; the IS 350's larger calipers are four-piston rather than the two-piston front calipers of the IS 250.

Citing independent testing by auto research firm AMCI, Lexus highlighted the IS 350's acceleration as the "fastest in its class" at its launch (see also: Lexus IS performance specifications). Some reviewers noted the second generation models as Lexus' first foray into the sport compact market that compared fairly well with its German competitors. However, some criticisms were that its steering was not as communicative as that of some rivals, the rear seat legroom (while improved over the first generation) was still tight, and that the six-speed manual was only available on the IS 250. However, the IS' performance has also been praised, for example in a February 2007 Road & Track Japanese luxury sports sedan comparison, in which the IS 350 took first place.

ALE20 / GSE22 (2006) 

Introduced for sale in European markets in 2006, the IS 220d (ALE20) was the first diesel-powered Lexus ever produced. The IS 220d featured a 2.2 L 2AD-FHV Inline-4 diesel engine, capable of 175 hp (130 kW), and rear wheel drive. The IS 220d was only offered with a manual transmission. Introduced to Chinese and Middle Eastern markets in 2006, the IS 300 (GSE22) was tailored to the fuel requirements of those regions, with a 3.0 L 3GR-FE V6 engine (without direct injection), 228 hp (170 kW), and rear wheel drive. The IS 300 was also introduced to the Brunei, Indonesia, and Philippines markets.

GSE20 / GSE21 (2008)

After three years with only one body style, the IS returned with a second body style, this time in coupé convertible form, debuting as the IS 250 C on 2 October 2008 at the Paris Motor Show. A more powerful IS 350 C also became available, with engine specifications analogous to those on the sedan models.

The IS convertible features a three-piece aluminum hardtop that can retract in 21 seconds, a roof-brake mechanism slows panels as they close and near the windshield. The IS 250 C and IS 350 C are offered with a six-speed automatic, while the IS 250 C was offered a manual transmission and all-wheel-drive version. However, as of 2015, the IS C is only available as rear-wheel-drive.

Sportier models of both trims are available in the form of the IS250 C F-Sport and IS350 F-Sport. As of 2015 these models are the only F-Sport Lexus's to be offered with a wide variety of performance options such as a "F-Sport Air Intake" and "F-Sport Sway Bars" but just like the other Lexus F-Sport models it is offered with a wide variety of wheel choices.

The IS 250 C went on sale in Europe in 2009, with IS convertible sales for North America targeted for May 2009 as a 2010 model. An IS 300 C is also being produced for certain regions.

ALE20 (2010)

In 2010, coinciding with the second IS line refresh, the IS 220d was replaced with the more efficient IS 200d, whose improved consumption figures were due to engine retuning. All-wheel drive options were also expanded besides the IS 250 AWD with the addition of the IS 350 AWD model in major markets.

F marque models 
During 2005 and 2006, several automotive publications reported on rumors of a higher performance variant of the IS being tested at various stages of development. Spy photos of such a vehicle being tested in Germany and California were published in several magazines and websites. Among these spy reports, several photos were shown of a heavily modified and camouflaged IS sedan at the Nürburgring test track in Germany along with other disguised Lexus test vehicles. The previous generation IS 430 prototype vehicle was indicative of future possibilities for the IS series, including the likelihood that a second generation high-performance IS model could come equipped with a V8 engine. It was rumored that there would be a coupé and a convertible version for a 2009 model, as well as a convertible version of the V8-powered IS.

USE20 (2007)

In early 2004, just after the final XE20 design had been frozen for production, Lexus engineer Yukihiko Yaguchi, assembled a small team and on a limited budget began work on a higher performance IS. By the first half of 2005, XE20-body prototype mules with the 4.6L 1UR-FE V8 were spotted testing on the Nürburgring. These prototypes were nicknamed "IS 460" by the media. In late 
2005, test mules were also spotted on the Nürburgring that were made using body panels from Toyota Crown Royals that were shortened by cutting out sections of the roof and rear doors. The winning exterior design proposal by Hiroshi Okamato (supervised by chief IS designer Kengo Matsumoto), was finalized in 2005.

On 6 December 2006, Lexus officially confirmed the existence of the vehicle which they called IS F in the press release. At the North American International Auto Show on 8 January 2007, the new IS F sedan was debuted to the public along with the LF-A supercar concept. Images were leaked a couple of hours before the official announcement. At its press debut, Lexus revealed that a separate "skunk works" team designed the IS F in a manner distinct from typical Lexus engineering efforts. The chief engineer of the IS F, Yukihiko Yaguchi, previously worked on the Toyota Supra. Much of the IS F's suspension tuning took place at Fuji Speedway in Japan.

The IS F vehicle body was lowered by 1 cm (0.5 inches) compared to the standard IS. The hood features a bulged appearance, with sharper curve than the standard IS, due to the added space needed to contain the 5.0 L V8 engine. The drag coefficient is 0.30 Cd. The exterior also features a wire-mesh grille, changed side fenders and skirts, along with side air vents. One noticeable element of the IS F design were its faux quad exhaust tailpipes consisting of two vertically stacked exhaust tips on each side that did not directly connect to the actual exhaust pipes ( tips were part of the bumper, rather than the exhaust). The interior features a four-passenger cabin with braided aluminum panels, steering wheel paddle shifters, and F marque emblems. The IS F also features different seating, with bucket seats in front and rear.

The engine redlines at 6800 rpm and also features a two-stage intake system, engine oil and automatic transmission fluid coolers and an oil pump designed for high-speed cornering. Along with both port and direct injection, the engine features VVT-iE camshaft timing, and has a compression ratio of 11.8:1. The 2UR-GSE is derived from the Lexus UR-series V8 engines, which debuted as the 1UR-FSE on the 2007 Lexus LS 460. Of the UR-series V8s, the 2UR-GSE is most closely related to the 2UR-FSE used in the 2008 LS 600h. It features the same bore and stroke dimensions (3.70 in x 3.52). However, extensive modifications carried out by the IS F engineering team in conjunction with Yamaha's Formula One (F1) engine program resulted in a cast-aluminum intake manifold, new cylinder heads, and titanium intake valves. Additionally the engine features a forged crankshaft, connecting rods and cam lobes. At maximum acceleration above 3400 rpm, the secondary intake opens. Compared with the LS 600h's 2UR-FSE (measured alone without its hybrid-electric motors), the IS F 2UR-GSE has more horsepower and torque at higher rpm, and 17 lb·ft less peak torque (see also Lexus IS F performance specifications).

The Lexus IS F features an 8-speed Sport Direct Shift (SPDS) automatic transmission with sequential shift which can lock-up the torque converter from 2nd through 8th gears (see also: Lexus IS transmission specifications). The SPDS is derived from the unit introduced in the 2007 Lexus LS, which was the first vehicle to carry an 8-speed transmission. The wheel-mounted paddle shifters allow for gear shifting while steering, and a manual mode can be selected for added control. The 8-speed transmission also improves fuel economy, with lower overall consumption than BMW, Mercedes, and Audi rivals, and avoidance of the U.S. Gas Guzzler Tax.

The IS F uses an all-electric rack and pinion steering system with a 13.6:1 gear ratio. The drivetrain is linked to a new sport version of Lexus' electronic stability control system (Vehicle Dynamics Integrated Management, or VDIM, featuring three distinct on-off modes). The Lexus IS F comes equipped with Brembo cross-drilled brake rotors (14.2 in front, 13.6 rear) and 6-piston front and 2-piston rear aluminum calipers stamped with the Lexus emblem, along with 19-inch BBS forged aluminum alloy wheels.

In October 2007, the IS F premiered in Japan, with a 500-unit yearly target for that country, and a 5,000–6,000 yearly unit target for the U.S. market. The IS F went on sale in the US in early 2008 with the first 50 IS F units sold as a limited Neiman Marcus special edition. In 2007, the head of Lexus GB stated in an interview that 150 IS Fs would be allocated for the UK market. For 2008, the IS F carried a base price of US$56,000.

For 2010, the IS F added a Torsen limited-slip differential, standard iPod/USB connectivity, Bluetooth streaming audio capability, casual language voice commands, and standard XM Satellite Radio. For the 2011 model year the electric power steering system and suspension were revised, with tweaks to the front and rear spring rates, shock absorber dampening, rear bushings and rear camber angle. An interior update included the addition of the Sport button to the steering wheel and a redesign of the gauge cluster featuring a large central tachometer similar to the Lexus LFA. The exterior adds LED daytime running lights and according to Lexus the 2011 IS F can lap Fuji Speedway in 2 minutes, 3.4 seconds or nearly 2 seconds quicker than before.

Aftermarket tuners, such as Wald International and FiveAxis, have produced special IS F models, which have been part of the manufacturer's auto show exhibits.

IS F Racing Concept (2008)
At the 2008 Tokyo Auto Salon, the IS F Racing Concept was shown. Few details were released at the show, other than that the concept was the work of chief engineer Yukihiko Yaguchi who built the concept "just for fun", to show "true driving pleasure", and exhibit a potential IS F race car. The IS F Racing Concept had larger fenders, wheels, and spoilers, in a similar manner as DTM racing cars. Reports at the event suggested that the vehicle was not planned for actual racing; rather instead different IS F models were being prepared for racing. The IS F later made its racing debut in VLN competition (see Lexus IS (XE20) in motorsport).

IS F police car (2009–)

The Humberside Police in the United Kingdom modified an IS F to use as a deterrent to high speed chases. Changes include computer platform to access all police records, 4 video cameras recording road in all directions, 2 hi-tech radio communication systems. The vehicle was used as the 'command car' for Humberside Police's Vehicle Crime Unit.

IS F Circuit Club Sports (2010)

The CCS is a version of IS F sedan with a carbon fiber reinforced polymer hood, trunk and rear spoilers, along with a rear titanium muffler, 19-inch magnesium wheels, and modified suspension and brakes. The carbon fiber components were produced using technology developed for the Lexus LFA supercar.

The vehicle was unveiled in 2010 Tokyo Auto Salon.

IS F Evolution
It was reported to be a version of IS F sedan with weight reduction (by 300 lbs), handling mods and brake upgrades. Front and rear bumpers, along with the front fenders, are replaced by carbon fiber parts. It uses 245/35R19 front and 275/30R19 tires, carbon ceramic brakes. Interior also incorporates carbon fiber parts and Recaro racing seats.

IS F-Sport 

At the 2007 SEMA show, Lexus had a formal presence at the aftermarket convention for the first time, and launched a line of "F-Sport" parts and accessories for the IS 250/350. The F-Sport line, including performance and accessory upgrades such as big brake kits, shocks, lowering springs, sway bars, chassis brace, light weight wheels, air intake, exhaust, engine cover, floor mats, shift knobs and also clutch for manual drive, was later expanded to the full IS lineup.

At the 2009 SEMA Show, the F-Sport line also released upgrades for IS 250 AWD and IS Convertible models.

Limited editions

Elegant White edition (2007–)

It is a limited (700 units) edition of the IS 250 and IS 350 for Japan market. It included a custom two-tone interior.

IS 250 X (2007–)

Lexus introduced a new badge into its lineup in 2007 – a new "X-Package" which was introduced into a number of countries. In the Australian market, it was introduced to celebrate the sale of the 5000th IS 250 in Australia. The IS 250 X came standard with: sport tuned suspension, exclusive 18-inch alloy five-spoke wheels, premium Mark Levinson 14 speaker stereo, moonroof, satellite navigation, illuminated scuff plates, rear camera and sports pedals, and a front lip spoiler. The "X" also came in 3 colors: Onyx Black, Vermillion Red and Metallic Silver. In order to retain the "exclusive" image, only 260 were released in the 2007 calendar year.

There were a number of changes made to the 2008 IS 250 X model. These included: changes to the steering system resulting in an improved steering feel, modified rear seats to improve rear room and the added choice of a new exterior colour – Arctic Blue. Lexus Australia also announced that 450 units would be released, compared to the 260 released the previous year. Production of the IS 250 X ceased in 2008.

Neiman Marcus 2008 Lexus IS F Special Build Sedan
It is a limited (50 units) version of IS F sedan sold by Neiman Marcus. Priced at US$68,000, the Neiman Marcus edition had a custom black with white accented interior with exterior black color. Each vehicle was individually numbered, and the owner also received a training session at the Skip Barber Racing School.

IS 250 SR (2008)
It is a limited (1000 units) version of IS 250 for the UK market. It included a full body kit, 17-inch 10-spoke alloy wheels, optional 18-inch Tsuki rims, Worcester Black interior fabric, with optional sports pedals and heated front seats.

Red-Edge Black edition (2009–)
It is a limited (500 units) edition of the IS 250 and IS 350 for Japan market. It included largely black leather interior with red trim.

2010 IS 350 C F-Sport (2010)
It is a limited (100 units) version of IS 350 C with 19-inch alloy wheels, special edition badging, a new front grille, lowered and upgraded sport suspension, larger brakes, and special blue interior stitching on black leather seats.

IS SUNRISE (2010)
It is a concept vehicle based on IS 250 sedan designed in conjunction with Spanish design duo Stone Designs, commemorating the fifth anniversary of the launch of Lexus Japan. The IS "Sunrise" model included a multi-tone interior with contrast seat leather hues of white, blue, and gray.

Motorsport

In 2008, the second generation IS 350 was entered in the Super GT race series in the GT300 class (cars with approximately 300 horsepower). Extensively modified from the factory car, with upgrades including a V8 engine, the No. 19 Team Racing Project Bandoh IS 350 driven by Manabu Orido and Tsubasa Abe achieved its first victory in its fifth race at the Motegi GT300 race. Other IS 350 GT300 competitors included those of the WedsSport and Green Tec/Kumho teams. In 2009, two manufacturer sanctioned Racing Project/Bandoh and Team Reckless/Shift IS 350s were also announced for competition, both equipped with 3.0L V8 engines. The Project Bandoh WedsSport IS 350, driven by Manabu Orido and Tatsuya Kataoka, won both driver and team title in the GT300 class that season.

In 2009, Gazoo Racing produced a Lexus IS F VLN racing vehicle, which was entered in the SP8 class of the ADAC-Westfalenfahrt VLN 4h endurance race. The vehicle finished second to the team's Lexus LF-A in the race. The IS F VLN racer was also entered in the 2009 24 Hours Nürburgring race and finished third in the SP8 class. The IS F was also later entered in the DMV Grenzlandrennen VLN 4h endurance race in August 2009 where it won the SP8 class. In Gazoo's win at the DMV Grenzlandrennen VLN race on 29 August 2009, Kazunori Yamauchi, the developer of Gran Turismo series who had little experience in actual motorsport, was also one of their drivers, along with Peter Lyon and Hideshi Matsuda. An IS F driven by Peter Lyon, Hideshi Matsuda, Kazunori Yamauchi, and Owen Mildenhall participated in the 2010 24 Hours Nürburgring and finished in 4th place in the SP8 class, behind the 1st place ranked Lexus LFA.

In 2012, Japanese drift racer Daigo Saito entered an IS 250 C in the Formula Drift Asia series. The car, which was a victim of the 2011 Japan earthquake and tsunami and due to be scrapped, was purchased by Saito and heavily customized for drift racing use. The most notable modification was the swapping of the stock engine to a 2JZ-GTE from a Mark IV Toyota Supra. With 1200 horsepower under the hood, Daigo obliterated the competition in that season, winning all the rounds and earning the championship in convincing fashion.

Technical specifications
Powertrain information for all second generation Lexus IS models are as follows:

Transmissions 
Lexus IS F transmission gear ratios are as follows:

Lexus IS transmission gear ratios are as follows:

Performance data

IS F
Official and tested performance specifications for the Lexus IS F are as follows:

Car and Driver also tested the IS F in 2008 and achieved a 0–60 time of 4.2 seconds. It is also rumored that the IS F can break  without the electronic limiter. British television show Top Gear tested the Lexus IS F against the BMW M3. The time for the IS F was of 1'26.9, compared to the M3's time of 1'25.3 around their test track.

IS 250/IS 350
Official performance specifications for the IS 350 are as follows:

Official performance specifications for the IS 250 are as follows:

Awards

Several awards won by the second generation Lexus IS include J.D. Power best vehicle in the entry luxury class, 2006 Initial Quality Survey, Ward's 10 Best Engines awards in 2006 and 2007 for the IS 350, 2007 IF product design award from the International Forum Design group in Hannover, Germany, and the Canadian Car of the Year Awards' Best New Technology award in 2006. The IS was also the 2007 winner of the Intellichoice/AutoPacific Motorist Choice Award for Aspirational Luxury Cars, referring to the vehicle owners most desired in the luxury segment, and a finalist for Wheels magazine's Car of the Year (COTY) awards and the World Car of the Year (WCOTY) award in 2006.

In November 2009, the Lexus IS F was named Best New Sports / Performance Car over CDN$50,000 for the year by the Automobile Journalists Association of Canada (AJAC). In October 2008, the IS F received a Good Design Award from the Japanese Industrial Design organization. In April 2008, Evo magazine's test of the IS F awarded the vehicle the publication's highest rating of five stars. That same month, AutoWeek'''s comparison test of the IS F with the GT-R found the former to be the "more satisfying to drive" winner. Also in 2008, Car magazine named the IS F as a finalist for its Performance Car of the Year award.

 Gaming 

In March 2008, Atari released the freeware computer game, Lexus IS F Track Time. The program was created in partnership with Lexus and based on the IS F production model specifications. Designed by Image Space Incorporated (ISI) using their rFactor computer racing simulator software, the program allows users to configure and race the IS F. Three race courses are offered, namely Orchard Lake (an oval and road course), Toban Raceway (a road course), and Essington Park, Lienz (a mountain road and rally course). The software incorporates artificial intelligence modeling of competing vehicles, and its physics engine simulates actual driving conditions.

The race-prepped Lexus IS F which competed at the 24 Hours Nürburgring race in October 2009 carried a prototype of a "GPS-track day" unit co-developed by the Gran Turismo'' game designers and Lexus supplier Denso corporation. The unit allows a GPS recording of an actual track drive, which is then stored on a memory card. The recording can then be plugged into a PlayStation 3 where one can view a virtual recreation of the race, or compete against one's own race record.

Production
The second generation Lexus IS is produced in Tahara, Aichi, and Miyawaka, Fukuoka, Japan. In most markets sold, the IS has served as the compact member of the Lexus lineup, and it was the smallest Lexus model until the CT 200h.

Only 486 units of the Lexus IS F were sold in 2012.

References

Notes

Designations

External links 

 
 
 

IS
All-wheel-drive vehicles
Compact executive cars
Euro NCAP large family cars
Hardtop convertibles
Rear-wheel-drive vehicles
Sports sedans
Cars introduced in 2005